Aldborough is a village and former civil parish, now in the parish of Aldborough and Thurgarton (together with Thurgarton), in the North Norfolk district, in the county of Norfolk, England. It is situated about eight miles (13 km) south of Cromer.

The name "Aldborough" derives from the Old English ald (old) and burh (fortification).

The civil parish has an area of 7.15 square kilometres and in 2001 had a population of 567 in 259 households, the population increasing to 578 at the 2011 Census.

Civil parish 
On 1 April 1935, the parish of Thurgarton was merged with Aldborough. On 1 January 2001, the new parish was renamed to "Aldborough & Thurgarton". In 1931 the parish of Aldborough (prior to the merge) had a population of 302.

War Memorial
Saint Mary's Church holds a memorial to ten men from the village who fell during the First World War. They are listed as: 

 Major Sydney G. Davey (1893-1918), 4th Battalion, Royal Norfolk Regiment
 Captain Edmund Gay (1883-1915), 5th Battalion, Royal Norfolk Regiment
 Second Lieutenant Frederick J. D. Spurrell (1896-1915), 9th Battalion, Royal Sussex Regiment
 Private Walter L. Bacon (1889-1916), 586th Maintenance Company, Royal Army Service Corps
 Private George J. Lewell (1884-1918), 5th Battalion, Duke of Cornwall's Light Infantry
 Private Herbert Lee (d. 1916), 11th Battalion, Hampshire Regiment
 Private Archibald Brett (d.1918), 8th Battalion, Leicestershire Regiment
 Private Oscar Martins (1892-1917), 2nd Battalion, Royal Norfolk Regiment
 Private William Wilkin (d.1917), 5th Battalion, Royal Norfolk Regiment
 Private Sidney A. Martins (1894-1916), 7th Battalion, Royal Norfolk Regiment

References

External links

Aldborough, Norfolk village website
Aldborough watermill history

Villages in Norfolk
Former civil parishes in Norfolk
North Norfolk